Todd D. Robinson (born c. 1963) is an American diplomat who has served as Assistant Secretary of State for International Narcotics and Law Enforcement Affairs since September 2021. He previously served as the charge d'affaires of the U.S. embassy in Venezuela from December 2017 until being expelled in May 2018, and the U.S. ambassador to Guatemala from 2014 to 2017.

Early life and education
Raised in Fanwood, New Jersey, Robinson graduated from Scotch Plains-Fanwood High School in 1981 and earned a Bachelor of Science in Foreign Service in 1985 from Georgetown University.

Robinson speaks Spanish, Italian and Albanian.

Consular career
Robinson joined the State Department in 1986, with his first postings to Colombia (in 1987) and El Salvador (in 1989). He returned to Washington in 1991, to work as watch officer at the operations center of the State Department. In 1993, Robinson was assigned to Rome, Italy as staff assistant to the ambassador at the time, Reginald Bartholomew and two years later was moved across the city to work as the political officer at the Embassy in Vatican City.

1997 saw Robinson return to Latin America to work as a political officer in the La Paz embassy, Bolivia until he was recalled in 1999 for a post as special assistant to the then Secretary of State, Madeleine Albright. The next year, he was sent to the Dominican Republic as deputy counselor for Political and Economic Affairs.

After four years at the embassy in Santo Domingo, Robinson was again posted to Europe to work as chief of the Political and Economic Section of the Albanian embassy in Tirana. Two years later, Robinson left to work as consul general at the consulate in Barcelona, Spain.

In 2009, he was posted to Guatemala as deputy chief of mission. He stayed until June 2011, when he was recalled to work in the Bureau of International Narcotics and Law Enforcement Affairs in Washington.

Ambassador to Guatemala
On June 3, 2014, President Barack Obama nominated Robinson for the ambassadorship to Guatemala. Hearings were held before the Senate Foreign Relations Committee on July 10, 2014. The committee favorably reported his nomination to the Senate floor on July 29, 2014. Robinson was confirmed by the entire Senate via voice vote on September 16, 2014.

He arrived in Guatemala City on October 10 the same year.

Venezuela Post
In December 2017, Robinson was reassigned by President Trump to be charge d'affairs en pied at the embassy in Caracas, Venezuela. In January 2018, Robinson attempted to obtain the release of American citizen, Joshua Holt who had been jailed in the country by meeting with Venezuelan foreign minister, Jorge Arreaza. On 22 May the same year, Robinson and his deputy, Brian Naranjo were expelled from the country as persona non grata by Nicolas Maduro, the newly re-elected president. Days later, Joshua Holt was freed and allowed to return to the USA.

Robinson then served as a senior advisor for Central America in the Bureau of Western Hemisphere Affairs in Washington D.C. and as the Director of the International Student Management Office at the National Defense University.

Biden administration

On April 12, 2021, President Joe Biden nominated Robinson as Assistant Secretary of State for International Narcotics and Law Enforcement Affairs. Hearings were held before the Senate Foreign Relations Committee on his nomination on June 15, 2021. The committee favorably reported his nomination to the Senate floor on June 24, 2021. On September 28, 2021, Robinson was confirmed by a vote of 53-41. 

He was sworn in on September 30, 2021.

References

1960s births
Living people
Ambassadors of the United States to Guatemala
Ambassadors of the United States to Venezuela
Walsh School of Foreign Service alumni
People from Fanwood, New Jersey
Scotch Plains-Fanwood High School alumni
United States Foreign Service personnel
United States Assistant Secretaries of State
Biden administration personnel